(J. 277, Op. 77 The Marksman or The Freeshooter) is a German opera with spoken dialogue in three acts by Carl Maria von Weber with a libretto by Friedrich Kind, based on a story by Johann August Apel and Friedrich Laun from their 1810 collection Gespensterbuch. It premiered on 18 June 1821 at the Schauspielhaus Berlin. It is considered the first German Romantic opera.

The opera's plot is mainly based on August Apel's tale "Der Freischütz" from the Gespensterbuch though the hermit, Kaspar and Ännchen are new to Kind's libretto. That Weber's tunes were just German folk music is a common misconception. Its unearthly portrayal of the supernatural in the famous Wolf's Glen scene has been described as "the most expressive rendering of the gruesome that is to be found in a musical score".

Performance history
The reception of Der Freischütz surpassed Weber's own hopes and it quickly became an international success, with productions in Vienna the same year followed by Dresden, Leipzig, Hamburg, Munich, Karlsruhe, Königsberg, Prague, other German centres, Riga and Copenhagen. 1824 saw productions in four London theatres in four different adaptations, as well as an inadequate adaptation by François Castil-Blaze in French, named Robin des Bois at the Théâtre de l'Odéon.

In order to get round the Paris Opera's ban on spoken text, a version in French with recitatives was prepared in 1841 by Hector Berlioz – who greatly admired the opera and feared other arrangers might do worse – which incorporated his orchestration of Weber's Invitation to the Dance to serve as a ballet, another Paris Opera requirement. Pyotr Ilyich Tchaikovsky criticised Berlioz's arrangement in the Bolshoi Theatre production of 1873 as "utterly incongruous", "tasteless" and "silly" because it inserted into the rustic opera an urban piece of music. In 1879 he again criticised a performance in Paris:
Der Freischütz afforded me great pleasure; in many places in the first act my eyes were moist with tears. In the second act Krauss pleased me greatly by her wonderful rendition of Agathe's aria. The Wolf's Glen was staged not at all as splendidly as I had expected. The third act was curious because of the French brazenness with which they took the liberty, on the one hand, of inserting Invitation à la valse with the most stupid dances, and, on the other, of cutting out the role of the hermit who appears at the end for the dénouement.

Berlioz's arrangement again underlay the production at the Paris Opéra-Comique in 2011. His orchestration of Invitation à la valse soon became a concert piece in its own right.

Weber's overture and the "Huntsmen's Chorus" from act 3 ("With princely enjoyment and manly employment") are often performed as concert pieces.

Roles
{| class="wikitable"
|+
!Role
!Voice type
!Premiere cast, Conductor: 
|-
|Ottokar, a sovereign prince
|baritone
|Gottlieb Rebenstein
|-
|Kuno, a hereditary forester
|bass
|Carl Wauer
|-
|Agathe, his daughter
|soprano
|Caroline Seidler
|-
|Ännchen, a young relative
|soprano
|Johanna Eunike
|-
|Caspar, first assistant forester
|bass
|Heinrich Blume
|-
|Max, second assistant forester
|tenor
|Heinrich Stümer
|-
|Samiel, the 'Black Huntsman'''
|spoken
|Joseph Hillebrand
|-
|Hermit
|bass
|Johann Georg Gern
|-
|Kilian, a wealthy peasant|baritone
|August Wiedemann
|-
|Four bridesmaids
|soprano
|Henriette Reinwald etc.
|-
|colspan=3|Hunters, peasants, spirits, attendants|}

Synopsis

Place: Bohemia
Time: shortly after the end of the Thirty Years' War

Act 1
At a shooting contest, the second assistant forester, Max, loses to a peasant, Kilian, who is proclaimed "King of marksmen" (Chorus: Viktoria! Der Meister soll leben—"Victory! Long live the master"). Kilian mocks him  good-naturedly (Schau der Herr mich an als König—"Let him gaze on me as king").

Max wants to marry Agathe, daughter of the head forester Kuno. In order to marry her and succeed her father as head forester, he has to prove his marksmanship and score in a shooting trial before Ottokar, the sovereign prince, on the following day.

As Max has had ill luck for several days, he muses upon his prospects of losing Agathe by failing the shooting test (Trio of Kuno, Kaspar, and Max; chorus: O diese Sonne—"O this sun"). 
Left alone in deep melancholy, he recalls happy days (Aria: Durch die Wälder, durch die Auen—"Through the forests, through the meadows").

Kaspar, the first assistant forester, falsely tries to imbue Max with wine and courage (Hier im ird'schen Jammerthal—"Here in this vale of tears"). He had hoped to marry Agathe himself but she had rejected him and chosen Max. The marriage would make Max the heir of Kuno who would see Max as a son. Kaspar seeks revenge upon all three – his rival, his former sweetheart and her father. He hands Max his gun and Max, to his own astonishment, hits an eagle soaring at a great height. Kaspar explains that the gun had been loaded with his last magic bullet.

He persuades Max to meet him at midnight in the terrible Wolf's Glen to cast seven more of the magic bullets. (Six hit, but the seventh belongs to the Evil One who can guide it wherever he pleases.) He warns Max not to tell a soul about their purpose so as not to endanger them. Left alone, Kaspar triumphs and boasts of his insidiousness (Aria: Schweig’! damit dich niemand warnt—"Silence! So that nobody warns you.").

Act 2Agathe's chamberAt the moment when Max shoots the magic bullet, a picture of Agathe's ancestor hanging on the wall falls to the floor, slightly wounding her. Agathe's cousin and companion Ännchen refastens the hook (Duet: Schelm, halt fest!—"Rogue, hold fast!"). She endeavours to cheer Agathe with jests (Ännchen: Kommt ein schlanker Bursch gegangen—"Comes a pretty boy this path"). Agathe, still disturbed, tells of her meeting with the hermit. He had indicated a danger from which his white consecrated roses would protect her.

Left alone, Agathe awaits Max with the news of his success (Recitative and aria: Wie nahte mir der Schlummer...Leise, leise—"How did slumber approach me...Low, low"). Max arrives, acknowledging that while he has not been the victor, he has killed an eagle. Though the night is falling, he has to leave again to bring in a stag which he had shot in the Wolf's Glen (Trio: Wie? Was? Entsetzen!—"What? What? Oh, horror!").The Wolf's Glen at nightAs the bell chimes twelve Kaspar calls upon Samiel, the Black Huntsman, for assistance in casting the magic bullets. Having already sold his own soul, which is due the next day, Kaspar offers Max’s soul in exchange for a prolongation of his soul of three years. Agathe is to be killed by Max's magic bullet, despair will then make him the Devil's, him – and the father. Samiel agrees ambiguously: "So be it – By the gates of hell! Tomorrow he or you!"

As Max arrives, the spirit of his mother warns him to abandon the project. But Samiel conjures up Agathe, seemingly drowning herself in despair, whereupon Max plunges into the glen. With demoniacal noise, the casting of the bullets begins.

Act 3The meeting of the marksmenHaving split the seven bullets between them, Max has used three during the hunt in the morning. Kaspar spoils his three on a fox. Thus Max's remaining bullet is the seventh, the Devil's bullet.Agathe's chamberAgathe is praying (Aria: Und ob die Wolke sie verhülle—"Through clouds obscure"), her doubts having returned owing to a dream of ill omen where she was a white dove which Max shot. Ännchen tries to cheer her with a spooky tale (Aria: Einst träumte meiner sel'gen Base—"My deceased cousin had a dream"). The bridesmaids bring the box with the bridal wreath (Song: Wir winden dir den Jungfern-Kranz—"We wind round thee the bridal wreath"). But as they open it they find a funeral wreath. Recalling the hermit's promise that the white roses will protect her, Agathe proposes to twine them to the bridal wreath.The marksmanship trialPrince Ottokar awaits Max at his tent (Chorus of foresters: Was gleicht wohl auf Erden—"What excels the pleasures of the chase"). As a test, Max is ordered to shoot the dove pointed out to him. Max takes aim, fires and Agathe, who has just entered the scene, falls as if hit (Finale: Schaut, o schaut—"See, oh see"). But her bridal wreath and the hermit behind her have deflected the bullet. It strikes Kaspar. Agathe revives from her faint and Kaspar, seeing a holy hermit by her side, realizes that he has failed. Samiel grasps him instead of Max, whereupon Kaspar expires, cursing hell and heaven.

Prince Ottokar orders the corpse to be thrown into the Wolf's Glen. Then he demands and receives an explanation from Max who confesses to shooting with magic bullets. Regardless of pleas from Kuno, Agathe, peasants, and huntsmen, the infuriated Prince forbids the marriage and banishes Max from the country.

The hermit seeks to appease the Prince (Aria: Wer legt auf ihn so strengen Bann! Ein Fehltritt, ist er solcher Büssung wert?—"Who lays so strict a sentence upon him? An error, is it worthy of such atonement?"). Only love of Agathe and fear of losing her had caused Max to stray from a life that was formerly without fault. Who is to raise the first stone? Who does not look into his own heart? Once he has completed a faultless probationary year, Max should be allowed to marry Agathe. To the exuberant joy of all the Prince accepts this judgement. After the probation, he himself will place the hand of Agathe in that of Max.

In the end, all join in a prayer of thanks.

Instrumentation
The opera is scored for a standard-sized orchestra composed of:

In the orchestra pit: 2 piccolos, 2 flutes, 2 oboes, 2 clarinets, 2 bassoons, 4 horns, 2 trumpets, 3 trombones, timpani, strings (violin I and II, viola, cello, double bass);
Onstage: 1 clarinet, 2 horns, 1 trumpet, violins, cellos.

Recordings

Derivative works
 Franz Liszt wrote a piano transcription of the overture in 1846 (S.575).
  wrote an introduction and variations on a theme from Der Freischütz for guitar in c. 1851.
 Stephen Heller composed 4 piano études on the Freischütz themes (Op. 127)
 Sigismond Thalberg included an arrangement of the duet "Schelm, halt fest!" (Ännchen and Agathe) in his L'art du chant appliqué au piano (Op.70).

References
Notes

Citations

Sources
 
 .
 
 

Further reading
 
 
 Singleton, Esther (1899). "Der Freischütz''", A Guide to the Opera, pp. 77–90. Dodd, Mead & Company

External links

 
 Libretto, opera-guide.ch (in German)
 English libretto, opera-arias.com
 Recordings of Der Freischütz, Creative Commons-licensed in Ogg and MP3 formats
 Der Freischütz (The Marksman) , details and synopsis, Naxos Records
 Discography, opera.stanford.edu

Operas by Carl Maria von Weber
Romantische Opern
German-language operas
1821 operas
Operas
Opera world premieres at the Berlin State Opera
The Devil in opera